Bena is an unincorporated community in Gloucester County, Virginia, United States. Bena has a post office with ZIP code 23018.

References

Unincorporated communities in Gloucester County, Virginia